The 1952 United States Senate election in Virginia was held on November 4, 1952. Incumbent Senator Harry F. Byrd Sr. was re-elected to a fifth term after defeating Independent Democrat H. M. Vise Sr. and Social Democrat Clarke Robb.

Results

References

Virginia
1952
United States Senate